United Nations Security Council resolution 1309, adopted unanimously on 25 July 2000, after recalling all previous resolutions on the question of the Western Sahara, in particular resolutions 1108 (1997), 1292 (2000), 1301 (2000) and 1308 (2000), the Council extended the mandate of the United Nations Mission for the Referendum in Western Sahara (MINURSO) until 31 October 2000.

The Security Council reiterated its support for MINURSO to implement the Settlement Plan and agreements by the parties to hold a referendum on self-determination for the people of Western Sahara. It noted that fundamental differences remained between Morocco and the Polisario Front over interpretations of the main provisions of the Settlement Plan, and regretted that no progress was made at meeting in June 2000 held in London.

The mandate of MINURSO was extended on the expectation that would meet under the auspicies of the Secretary-General's Personal Envoy for further discussions to resolve the areas of disagreement. The Secretary-General was asked to provide an assessment of the situation before the end of MINURSO's mandate.

See also
 Free Zone (region)
 History of Western Sahara
 Political status of Western Sahara
 List of United Nations Security Council Resolutions 1301 to 1400 (2000–2002)
 Sahrawi Arab Democratic Republic
 Moroccan Western Sahara Wall

References

External links
 
Text of the Resolution at undocs.org

 1309
2000 in Morocco
 1309
 1309
July 2000 events